Kaluwanchikudy (களுவாஞ்சிக்குடி, Kalu-wanchi-kudy) is a town in the Batticaloa District of Sri Lanka. It is located about 30 km southeast of Batticaloa. It is in the coastal region. Kaluwanchikudy beach is a nice picnic spot to visit. Now the Ampilanthurai town is developing very fast. There is a big lake in Kaluwanchikudy and other side of the lake there is a river.

References

Towns in Batticaloa District
Manmunai South and Eruvilpattu DS Division